Sir Edward Mervyn Archdale, 1st Baronet, PC (Ire), DL (26 January 1853 – 1 November 1943) was a Northern Irish politician.

Archdale was born the son of Nicholas Montgomery Archdale and his wife Adelaide Mary (née Porter) in Rossfad, County Fermanagh. He entered the Royal Navy in 1867. He was promoted Lieutenant in 1875 and retired in 1881.

He was appointed High Sheriff of Fermanagh for 1884. In 1898 he was elected Conservative Member of Parliament for North Fermanagh. He resigned in 1903, but regained the seat in 1916. The seat was abolished in 1922.

In 1921 he stood for the new Parliament of Northern Ireland and was elected for Fermanagh and Tyrone. He held that seat until 1929, and was then elected for Enniskillen, retiring in 1937.

From 1921 to 1925, he served as Minister of Agriculture and Commerce in the Government of Northern Ireland and continued as Minister of Agriculture from 1925 to 1933. As a landowner and practical farmer he was well-qualified for the job. After Archdale's departure from his position, Cahir Healy, a Nationalist leader and member of the Northern Ireland House of Commons, criticised both the Prime Minister of Northern Ireland, James Craig, and Archdale for their public campaign against the employment of Catholics. Healy stated that Archdale's slogan was "No Catholics need apply" and said that this policy was not a new one: "Sir Edward Archdale...declared on 31 March 1925 that out of 109 officials in his Department only four were Roman Catholics, and he apologized for even having four in the service of the Government."  

Archdale was appointed to the Privy Council of Ireland in the 1921 New Year Honours, entitling him to the style "The Right Honourable", and was created a baronet in 1928. He was succeeded in the baronetcy by his eldest son, Vice-Admiral Sir Nicholas Edward Archdale.

Arms

Footnotes

References
Obituary, The Times, 3 November 1943

External links
 Bio at The Peerage.com

1853 births
1943 deaths
People from County Fermanagh
Royal Navy officers
Farmers from Northern Ireland
Baronets in the Baronetage of the United Kingdom
High Sheriffs of County Fermanagh
Lord-Lieutenants of Tyrone
Members of the Privy Council of Ireland
Members of the Privy Council of Northern Ireland
Members of the Parliament of the United Kingdom for County Fermanagh constituencies (1801–1922)
Irish Unionist Party MPs
Ulster Unionist Party members of the House of Commons of the United Kingdom
UK MPs 1895–1900
UK MPs 1900–1906
UK MPs 1910–1918
UK MPs 1918–1922
Members of the House of Commons of Northern Ireland 1921–1925
Members of the House of Commons of Northern Ireland 1925–1929
Members of the House of Commons of Northern Ireland 1929–1933
Members of the House of Commons of Northern Ireland 1933–1938
Northern Ireland Cabinet ministers (Parliament of Northern Ireland)
Deputy Lieutenants of Tyrone
Grand Masters of the Orange Order
Members of the House of Commons of Northern Ireland for Fermanagh and Tyrone
Members of the House of Commons of Northern Ireland for County Fermanagh constituencies
Ulster Unionist Party members of the House of Commons of Northern Ireland